Malta is a lightly carbonated, non-alcoholic malt beverage brewed from barley, hops, and water; corn and caramel color may also be added.

Distribution
Most Malta is brewed in the Caribbean and can be purchased in areas with substantial Caribbean populations.

See also
 Malt beer
 List of barley-based beverages
 Low-alcohol beer
 Root beer
Malt syrup 
Vitamalt

References

External links

Barley-based drinks
Soft beers and malt drinks
Soft drinks
Caribbean drinks
Malt-based drinks
Non-alcoholic drinks